The Australian Drivers' Championship was a motor racing championship contested annually from 1957 to 2014 by drivers of cars complying with Australia's premier open-wheeler racing category as determined by the Confederation of Australian Motor Sport. From  2005 to 2014 this category was Formula 3 and the championship was promoted as the Formula 3 Australian Drivers' Championship. Each year, the winner was awarded the CAMS Gold Star. The title was revived in 2021 for the new S5000 category.

It was the third oldest continuously awarded title in Australian motorsport, with only the Australian Grand Prix (since 1928) and the Australian Hillclimb Championship having a longer uninterrupted history. While originally intended to be the premier prize for domestic motor racing it had faded in importance over time and from the 1980s had been effectively a feeder series for the Australian Touring Car Championship and V8 Supercars Championship, or a launch pad for drivers to start international careers.

History
The first title in 1957 was open in regulation, effectively Formula Libre. While the age of the 'Australian special', handbuilt racecars developed by local mechanic/engineers away from the European/American manufacturers that had dominated pre-World War II racing, was not yet dead, most notably the series of Maybach specials were still competitive as second-hand Formula 1 and Formula 2 cars from Europe became increasingly popular with competitors, with the Maserati 250F finding a few homes in the top echelon of drivers.

The rise of Cooper in Europe, led by Jack Brabham, Bruce McLaren and the rest of the Australian/New Zealand invasion that flooded into Formula 1 in the 1960s, saw a trickle down effect increase as the smaller cheaper rear-engined packages proved quickly popular amongst competitors. The competitive nature of the racing as well as the reputation of antipodean personnel in Europe saw the factory teams look towards racing in Australia/New Zealand during the European winter. This led to the development of the Tasman Series regulations and a flood of Coopers and Brabhams into Australian racing, as well as encouraging the rise of domestic manufacturers like Elfin Sports Cars.

As the Tasman series faded there was a considerable push for a two-litre open formula to replace the Tasman regulations, however with Formula 5000 already having a strong foothold with competitors two-litre fell by the wayside. While F5000 was popular by this stage the Australian Touring Car Championship had surpassed it for popularity, a situation that would continue until today where the Australian Drivers' Championship is now seen as a young driver development category.

Formula 5000 continued until 1981, with fields shrunk to less than ten cars at some venues, a local variant of Formula Atlantic already in use since the late 70s, was adopted and proved immediately successful with large numbers of Ralt RT4s imported. But Pacific, or Formula Mondial as it was later re-badged, faded by 1987 and the local Australian Formula 2 category was adopted for a single race format while a Formula 3000 based formula, later titled Formula Holden was developed. Formula Holden ran from 1989 to 2003 by which stage this formulae had become unviable, the international death of Formula 3000 causing a supply of chassis to dry up. In 2005 the present international Formula 3 regulations was adopted.

Dwindling grid numbers in Australian Formula 3 saw CAMS elect not to award the Gold Star in 2015 for the first time in its history. This decision was made after the season had begun.

In 2020 it was decided to revive the Gold Star for the new S5000 series of V8 open wheelers. The COVID-19 pandemic prevented a championship from being contested in 2020 delaying the titled being awarded until May 2021 when the 2021 season concluded.

Champions

Sourced in part from:

References

External links
 Formula 3 Australia website

 
Recurring events established in 1957
Drivers'
Australian Formula 3
1957 establishments in Australia
Sports leagues established in 1957